"The Theologians" (original title: "Los teólogos") is a short story by Argentinian writer Jorge Luis Borges. It was featured in the collection Labyrinths. It was originally published in Los Anales de Buenos Aires in April 1947 and appears in the 1949 short story collection The Aleph.

Plot
The story follows Aurelian and John of Pannonia, who compete with one another as theologians. Though much of their work is a thinly veiled criticism of one another, the topic of their writing is regarding the heretical factions that appear around them such as the Monotoni, whose heresy is to preach that "history is a circle, and that all things have existed and will exist again", and the Histrioni, who argue that all individuals occupy dual forms – one on earth and one in heaven – and that actions on earth influence heaven.

Though at first, he struggles to put to words the nature of their heresy, he is surprised when a subconscious sentence springs forward that efficiently describes their beliefs. Upon closer consideration, he realizes that the sentence was taken from an old text written by John and that such a text could be considered heretical. Aurelian identifies John as the text's author and he is sentenced to death. John is burnt at the stake for heresy, and Aurelian later dies in a fire caused by a lightning strike. The narrator notes that the remainder of the story is rife with metaphor since it must take place in heaven but considers the possibility that in the eyes of an ineffable divine intelligence, both Aurelian and John of Pannonia may appear to be a single person.

Analysis
A strict reading of the story deals with morality and heresy, but a broader reading deals with the internal pathos man struggles with when questioning truth and one’s own life's importance. The obolus, along with the mirror, is a symbol of one of the new schisms in the story. The author uses a quote of Luke 12:59, that points to reconciling with one's apparent enemy, translated as "no one will be released from prison until he has paid the last obolus."

Meditating over the author's use of symbols is not overindulgence into speculation or academic over-analysis because Borges' attention to symbols in the story appears purposeful.  The story's premise, that the orthodoxy of ancient Christianity feared groups breaking away from the Christian world, is first expressed in the story by stating that certain symbols were being exalted by a group of people ("In the mountains, the Wheel and the Serpent had displaced the Cross. ...all were afraid...."). Use of a different symbol is not just the author visually explaining that one group in the mountains has a different version of Truth.  The author's attention to symbols (such as the wheel, the cross, the mirror, the obolus, and even the "iron scimitar") suggest that the battle between orthodoxy and heresy is a war between these physical objects that provide a doorway to esoteric spiritual truth.  The author Henry Corbin wrote that symbol was the clothing that must not be robbed from us, nor ignored by us, as the symbolism of the physical world is our only entry way into intellectually the divine. The stark physical nature of the world is expressed in the story's first symbol, the "iron scimitar" worshipped by the barbarians as a god.  Such a preposterous and seemingly ridiculous notion is asserted at the story's beginning so that the reader carelessly overlooks it, only to re-examine one's own reaction later.  "The Theologians" is a story about our struggle to discern truth, and the folly that befalls us when we cast aside other notions of truth, however barbaric, only later to see that we had cast our own selves into the flames countless times into eternity.

References

Short stories by Jorge Luis Borges
1947 short stories